The following are the national records in athletics in Pakistan maintained by the Athletics Federation of Pakistan (AFP).

Outdoor

Key to tables:

h = hand timing

# = not recognised by World Athletics

NWI = no wind information

Men

Women

Junior Men

Indoor

Men

Women

Notes

See also 
 National Athletics Championships 
 Athletics in Pakistan
 Pakistan Sports Board

References
General
Pakistani Records 31 August 2022 updated
World Athletics Statistic Handbook 2022: National Outdoor Records
World Athletics Statistic Handbook 2022: National Indoor Records
Specific

External links
 AFP official website

National records in athletics (track and field)
Records
Athletics records